Vidar Sandbeck (July 21, 1918 – November 10, 2005) was a Norwegian folk singer, composer, and writer.

Sandbeck was born in Åmot, in modest conditions, and suffered from poor health during much of his childhood.  He became a prodigy on the violin at an early age and had his public debut in Stjørdal in 1941. He gave up a professional career as a violinist early on to make ends meet and provided himself with odd jobs in his home town.

He wrote poetry on the side and published his first collection in 1954. His creative efforts soon extended to include composition and performance of ballads, classical works, and books.  He was also an accomplished wood carver. He told stories to children on radio. He won a number of awards and commendations.

Sandbeck published 40 books of various kinds.  He died in his home town of Åmot, aged 87.

Bibliography
 Anitras dans (Anitra's Dance) - 1983
 Far (Father) - 1984
 Fy skam deg! (Shame on You!) - 1977
 En handelsreisendes liv (The Life of a Travelling Merchant) - 1980
 Husbondens røst (The Voice of the Husband) - 1982
 Kanarifuglen - 1988.
 Kjærlighet og gråbensild - Cappelen - 1967 
 Kjærtegn på vidvanke - 1970
 Langs bygdevegen - Dagfinn Grønoset og Vidar Sandbeck - 1960
 Månen lo over Ravneberget - 1964
 Rundtramper og flatfele - 1962
 Stakkars kroken - 1978
 Trøste oss! (Poor us!) - 1979

References

External links
Home page of the Norwegian Sandbeck Society

1918 births
2005 deaths
People from Åmot
Norwegian  male writers
Norwegian folk singers
20th-century Norwegian male singers
20th-century Norwegian singers